Tërthore is a former municipality in Kukës County, Albania. At the 2015 local government reform it became a subdivision of the municipality Kukës. The population at the 2011 census was 2,959.

References

Former municipalities in Kukës County
Administrative units of Kukës